Akui Kamalabala Women's College, established in 2016, is a general degree women's college in Akui, Indas, in the Bankura district. It offers undergraduate courses in arts. It is affiliated to  Bankura University.

Departments

Arts
Bengali, 
English,
History,
Political Science,
Philosophy.

See also

References

External links 
 

Universities and colleges in Bankura district
Colleges affiliated to Bankura University
Educational institutions established in 2016
2016 establishments in West Bengal